The sombre kingfisher (Todiramphus funebris) is a species of bird in the family Alcedinidae. It is endemic to island of Halmahera, in North Maluku, Indonesia.

Its natural habitats are subtropical or tropical moist lowland forest, subtropical or tropical mangrove forest, subtropical or tropical swamps, and plantations. It is threatened by habitat loss.

Description

This is a relatively large kingfisher, measuring up to 28 cm. It has a piebald colouring with white belly and collar, and olive to black upper parts. The beak is dark. Its call is a slow 'ki-ki-ki'; it may also utter series of three loud wails.

Distribution and habitat
The sombre kingfisher occurs only on Halmahera, where it inhabits primary forest (frequently close to clearings), swamp-forest, mature secondary woodland, and mangroves. It may visit cultivated areas such as plantations.

Conservation
The species has been protected under Indonesian law since 1931 and benefits from several protected areas. However, it is currently classified as Least concern by the IUCN.

References

External links

BirdLife Species Factsheet.
The Internet Bird Collection

sombre kingfisher
sombre kingfisher
Birds of Halmahera
sombre kingfisher
sombre kingfisher
Taxonomy articles created by Polbot